Neiva is the capital of the Department of Huila.  It is located in the valley of the Magdalena River in south central Colombia with a population of about 357,392 inhabitants. It is one of the most important cities in southern Colombia, mainly because of its strategic geographical location.

History
Neiva was first founded in 1539 by Juan de Cabrera in an area now belonging to the municipality of Campoalegre. In 1550, Juan de Alonso y Arias relocated the city to the place that is now the municipality of Villavieja. At this location, the city was destroyed by indigenous tribes in 1560. The city was founded, at its current location, for the third and final time in 1612 by Diego de Ospina y Medinilla.

Neiva became important during the colonial times because of its strategic location. It was located in the trade route that communicated the Viceroyalty of Peru with Bogotá and Caracas. The city was declared as the capital of the Province of Neiva, made up of the Neiva, La Plata, Timaná, Purificación cabildos. In 1905 the city became the capital of the newly created Huila Department, which had been severed from the Tolima Department by the national government.

In 1967, the city was hit severely by an earthquake of magnitude 7.2. The earthquake destroyed several buildings including the Palacio de las 57 ventanas, the Governor's building.

In 2003 the city was the scene of a large bombing that was targeted at the Colombian President. 13 people were killed.

Geography and climate
The city has the dry-summer tropical savannah climate (Köppen climate classification: As), relatively rare and scattered across the world.

Due to its location near the equator and its low altitude, the city has a hot annual average climate with daytime temperatures ranging from 88 to 95 degrees Fahrenheit. It is about 300 kilometers / 186.4 miles (about a five-hour drive) from the Colombian capital, Bogotá.

The city of Palembang in Indonesia is the antipode of Neiva.

Ethnography
According to DANE, the ethnography composition of the city is:
 Whites or Europeans descendants and mestizos: 98.9%%
 Indigenous: 0,3%
 Black, mulatto or afro-descendant: 0,8%

Economy
Neiva is a distribution center for many consumer goods to the national economy such as rice, coffee, beef, milk, leather by-products and other agricultural products. Its annual agricultural fair held in May showcases horses, cattle and pork from local municipalities and other surrounding towns.

Tourist attractions
Throughout the city a tourist might enjoy the scattered city monuments, especially around the edges of the Magdalena River, where the local government has been maintaining the recently built sanctuary meant to safeguard the Magdalena from any pollutants and human produced contamination. Around this sanctuary there are parks and gardens usually crowded by locals and tourists who came to the growing city. The city can be reached by road travel, or by all major national airlines, coming to the Benito Salas Airport.

Education
Neiva is home to several universities which serve primarily Southern Colombia. Among the most important are the Universidad Surcolombiana, the Corporación Universitaria del Huila, and the Universidad Cooperativa de Colombia.

Transport

Air transportation
The Benito Salas Airport, named after Benito Salas Vargas, is located inside the city and serves domestic destinations.

Culture
The city is known as the Bambuco capital. José Eustasio Rivera, born in Rivera, is the most famous writer of a "pléyade" of creators that lived in Neiva (Regulo Suárez, Eustaquio Álvarez, Felio Andrade, Antonio Iriarte, Yezid Morales, Humberto Calderón, Jorge Guebelly, Luis Alberto Campos, Winston Morales, Jader Rivera, David Alberto Campos)

Festivals and events
This city is known for the Festival Folclórico y Reinado Nacional del Bambuco festivities held between the last two weeks of June and early July. During this time, there are daily parades through the downtown area and showings of the Sanjuanero, a folk dance, where the participants dress in a typical costumes and compete for being the best performers of the Sanjuanero choreography.

Sports
Soccer is currently the most popular sport in the city. The city is the base for the Atlético Huila club which competes in the top division of the Colombian professional football (soccer) league, the Categoría Primera A. The games are played at the Guillermo Plazas Alcid Stadium.

Basketball had historically a high popularity, although it has decreased in recent years. The cities Basketball games are played at the Coliseo Álvaro Sánchez Silva court.

The city has hosted important national and international sport events. For example:
XI National Games of Colombia 1980
Juvenile Finswimming World Championship 2008
South American Basketball Championship 2010
FIBA Americas Championship for Women 2011

The city of Neiva was one of the host cities for the 2016 FIFA Futsal World Cup.

Sister cities
  Kungsbacka, Sweden
  Cadiz, Spain
  Gold Coast, Queensland, Australia
  Los Angeles, United States
  Milan, Italy
  Bogotá, Colombia
  Lyon, France
  Malmö, Sweden
  Cartagena de Indias, Colombia
  Perth, Western Australia
  Leesburg, Florida, United States
  Palembang, South Sumatra, Indonesia

Notable people 
 Misael Pastrana Borrero, president of Colombia
 Olga Duque de Ospina, senator and governor of Huila
 Rodrigo Lara, lawyer and politician
 Natalia Valenzuela, model, presenter and beauty pageant titleholder
 Claudia Bahamón, model and presenter

See also
 Immaculate Conception Cathedral, Neiva
 Neiva National Telegraph and Post Office Building

Gallery

References

External links
 Neiva official website
 Opanoticias Daily Newspaper from Neiva
 La Nación Daily Newspaper from Neiva
 Diario del Huila Daily Newspaper

Populated places on the Magdalena River
Municipalities of Huila Department
Capitals of Colombian departments